Hingoli is a city and a municipal council in Hingoli district in the Indian state of Maharashtra with the population of 184,443.

Description 
Hingoli is a city and a municipal council in Hingoli district in the Indian state of Maharashtra. The Hingoli district taluka has total population 184,443, out of which 94,970 are male and 89,473 are female.

Places
The Hingoli City has total population 85,103, out of which Hindu 53.41%, Muslim  33.47%, Christian 0.24%, Sikh 0.13%, Buddhist 10.63%, Jain 2.03%, Others 0.02%, Not Stated 0.07%.

Tourist places 

The following temples are of interest for their architecture:
 Chintamani Ganpati Temple, Marwadi Galli
 Paltan masjid markaz, paltan
 Pola Maruti Temple, Mangalwara
 Jaleshwar Mahadev Temple (present in the lake)
 Chirag shah baba, risala
 Shri Datta Mandir, Mangalwara
 Dakshinmukhi Hanuman Temple, Khatkali
 Eid gha, aundha road
 Masjid a mehraj, pention pura

Other locations include:
 Aundha Nagnath Temple
 Sant Namdev Sansthan
 Mallinath Digambar Jain Mandir
 Siddheshwar Dam
 Maharudhr maruti barashivha
 Bahubali Statue Pusegaon
 Appaswami maharaj Mandir,sengoan

Rail transport 

Hingoli Railway Station is a railway station on Purna-Akola section of Nanded Division of South Central Railway.

References

Cities and towns in Hingoli district
Talukas in Maharashtra